Romania competed at the 1936 Summer Olympics in Berlin, Germany. The nation returned to the Olympic Games after having missed the 1932 Summer Olympics. 54 competitors, 52 men and 2 women, took part in 33 events in 9 sports.

Medalists 

|  style="text-align:left; width:72%; vertical-align:top;"|

| style="text-align:left; width:23%; vertical-align:top;"|

Silver 
 Henri Rang — Equestrian, Jumping Individual

Athletics

Men's Long Jump
Bogdan Ionescu-Crum — did not qualify → no ranking
Men's Discus Throw
Ioan Havaleţ — did not qualify → no ranking
50 km Walk
Gheorghe Firea — 5:09:39 → 20th place

Boxing

Flyweight
Dumitru Panaitescu — lost to Nunag (Philippines) → no ranking
Bantamweight
Ioan Gaşpar — lost to Stasch (Germany) → no ranking
Featherweight
Nicolae Berechet — lost to Seeberg (Estonia) → no ranking
Lightweight
Gheorghe David — lost to Facchin (Italy) → no ranking

Equestrian

Grand Prix des Nations Show Jumping Event, individual
Henri Rang — on "Delfis" 4 penalty points in 144,2 seconds (→  Silver Medal) 
Ion Apostol — on "Dracu Ştie" 28 penalty points in 191 seconds (→ 29th place)
Toma Tudoran — on "Hunter" — DNF → no ranking

Grand Prix des Nations Show Jumping Event, Team
Team roster: Henri Rang on "Delfis", Ion Apostol on ""Dracu Ştie", Toma Tudoran on "Hunter"
Romania disqualified, because of Tudoran not finishing the course (→ no ranking)

Fencing

Seven fencers, five men and two women, represented Romania in 1936.

Men's épée
Nicolae Marinescu — qualified from the 1st round (4 v,1 d), eliminated in 2nd round (2 v, 4 d)
Denis Dolecsko — eliminated in the 1st round (1 v, 4 d)
Ioan Miclescu-Prăjescu — qualified from the 1st round (4v, 2 d), eliminated in the 2nd round (3v,2 d, lost barrage to Campbell-Gray, Great Britain)

Men's sabre
Denis Dolecsko — qualified from the 1st round (4 v, 1 d), eliminated in 2nd round (1 v, 4 d)
Nicolae Marinescu — qualified from the first round (4 v, 2 d), eliminated in 2nd round (0 v, 5 d)
Kamilló Szathmáry — eliminated in the 1st round (3v, 3d, lost barrage to Harry, Great Britain)

Men's team sabre
Team roster: Nicolae Marinescu, Gheorghe Man, Denis Dolecsko, Kamilló Szathmáry.
Romania eliminated in 1st round:
lost to Germany (6-10)
lost to Uruguay (8-8, 57-60 td)

Women's foil
Thea Kellner — eliminated in Pool Stage (0 v, 5 d)
Gerda Gantz — eliminated in Pool Stage (1 v, 5 d)

Gymnastics

Men's team
Team roster:Drăghici, Matuşek, Ludu, Abraham, Dan, Schmidt, Albert, Moldoveanu.
Romania — 71.566 p. (→ 14th place)
Individual all-around
Ludu — 11.966 p. (→ 93rd place)
Abraham — 10.093 p. (→ 98th place)
Albert — 9.900 p. (→ 99th place)
Matuşek — 9.050 p. (→ 101st place)
Dan — 9.037 p. (→ 103rd place)
Drăghici — 8.500 p. (→ 105th place)
Schmidt — 8.370 p. (→ 107th place)
Moldoveanu — did not complete the all-around competition (→ no ranking)

Handball

Team roster: Fesci, Zoller, Carl Haffer, Franz Haffer, Zickeli, Höchsmann, Speck, Zacharias, Kirschner, Halmen, Halder, Hermannstädter, Schorsten, Holzträger, Herzog.
Lost to Austria (3-18)
Lost to Switzerland (6-8)
Defeated U.S.A. (10-3) (→ Fifth place)

Shooting

Four shooters represented Romania in 1936.

50 m pistol
 Vasile Crişan

50 m rifle, prone
 Mihai Ionescu-Călineşti
 Gheorghe Mirea
 Eduard Grand

Wrestling

Bantamweight
József Tõzsér — defeated Bayle (France) (throw 11:58), defeated Tóth (Yugoslavia) (decision 3-0), defeated Bertoli (Italy) (throw 2:50, lost to Brendel (Germany) (throw 16:24), lost to Perttunen (Finland) (decision 2-1) (→ Fifth place)
Featherweight
Dezsõ Horváth — lost to Hering (Germany) (throw 11:36), defeated Janda (Czechoslovakia) (decision 3-0), defeated Kracher (France) (throw 6:28), lost to Reini (Finland) (throw 5:28) (→no ranking)
Lightweight
Ilie Borlovan — defeated Kálmán (Hungary) (decision 2-1), defeated Arikan (Turkey) (decision 2-1), lost to Koskela (Finland)(throw 8:51) (→no ranking)
Middleweight
Marin Cocoş — defeated Gogel (Switzerland) (throw 5:30), lost to Schweikert (Germany) (throw 8:28), defeated Pointner (Austria)(throw 2:21), lost to Kokkinen (Finland) (throw 3:00) (→ Fifth place)
Heavyweight
Tibor Kondorossy — lost to Nyman (Sweden) (throw 6:51), lost to Palusalu (Estonia) (throw 10:36 ) (→no ranking)

Art competitions

References

External links
 Official Olympic Reports
 International Olympic Committee results database

Nations at the 1936 Summer Olympics
1936
1936 in Romanian sport